Neer Bhare Tere Naina Devi is an Indian television series that aired on Imagine TV produced by Shakuntalam Telefilms and directed by Anshuman Kishore Singh. It premiered on 18 January 2010 and ended on 16 July 2010. The show was critically acclaimed for its realistic presentation.

Plot
Laxmi is born to an extremely poor family in a drought stricken village, craving for rain. Her father, who is in no position to feed her, decides to abandon her in the village temple. However, at that very moment, the rain gods smile on the village and a three-year-long drought is broken. Laxmi is proclaimed to be the bearer of this good fortune and is bestowed the status of a Goddess.

While she receives special care and attention, she is also forced to lead an abnormal life, very different from a regular girl her age. The story traces Devi's exploitation at the hands of the village, entrenched in blind faith and superstition.

Cast
 Dipika Kakar as Devi 
Reem Sheikh as Devi (kid)
 Deepali Pansare as Suhaagi
 Akshita Rajput as Dhaniyaa
 Hemant Pandey as Ghasita
 Abhaas Mehta as Pranay
 Nimai Bali as Chaudhary
 Sumon Chakravarti 
 Alpesh Gehlot 
 Chitrapama Bannerjee
 Parth Shukla 
 Ram Met har Jangra

2010 Indian television series debuts
2010 Indian television series endings
Imagine TV original programming
Indian television soap operas